Lynn Amedee (born August 3, 1941) is a former American football player and coach. He served as assistant at nine different colleges and as head coach at the University of Tennessee at Martin.

Amedee played quarterback and placekicker under coaches Paul Dietzel and Charles McClendon at Louisiana State from 1960–1962. He was not drafted in the 1963 NFL Draft but started a pro career with the Edmonton Eskimos. From 1963 to 1964, Amedee played in 16 games for the Eskimos. Over the course of the two seasons, he threw for 1,788 yards on 279 attempts with eight touchdowns. Later Amedee started a coaching career, returning to his alma mater as quarterbacks coach under head coach McClendon from 1975 to 1978.

In 1980, he became head coach at the University of Tennessee at Martin. He guided the school to an 8–14 record in two years before resigning in order to join the coaching staff at Southwestern Louisiana (now Louisiana-Lafayette). He left USL after one season, heading to Vanderbilt to become offensive coordinator under head coach George MacIntyre. Amedee left Vanderbilt after the 1984 season, as he was hired as offensive coordinator by new Texas A&M head coach Jackie Sherrill. In 1988, he became offensive coordinator under head coach Galen Hall at the University of Florida, where he drew criticism for his strategy to use sophomore running back Emmitt Smith as a "decoy". 1988 was Smith's only season with less than 1,000 yards rushing.

In 1989 Amedee was hired as offensive coordinator by Texas head coach David McWilliams. After McWilliams resignation in 1991, Amedee sat out for a year, before joining Curley Hallman's coaching staff at his alma mater LSU. Hallman, along with the coaching staff, was fired after the 1994 season. Amedee went on to coach one season at New Iberia (Louisiana) Senior High, and left the school that December to accept the offensive coordinator position under Sherrill at Mississippi State. In 1999, Amedee left the collegiate ranks, taking over head coaching duties at Opelousas High School in Opelousas, Louisiana, he retired after the 2003 season.

Head coaching record

College

References

1941 births
Living people
American football quarterbacks
American players of Canadian football
Canadian football quarterbacks
Birmingham Americans coaches
Edmonton Elks players
Florida Gators football coaches
High school football coaches in Louisiana
Louisiana Ragin' Cajuns football coaches
LSU Tigers football coaches
LSU Tigers football players
Mississippi State Bulldogs football coaches
New Orleans Saints coaches
Players of American football from Baton Rouge, Louisiana
Tennessee Volunteers football coaches
UT Martin Skyhawks football coaches
Texas A&M Aggies football coaches
Texas Longhorns football coaches
Vanderbilt Commodores football coaches
Players of Canadian football from Louisiana